The 1989 Kansas State Wildcats football team represented Kansas State University in the 1989 NCAA Division I-A football season. The team's head football coach was Bill Snyder. The Wildcats played their home games in KSU Stadium. The season saw the Wildcats finish with a record of 1–10, and a 0–7 record in Big Eight Conference play. This was Snyder's first season as head coach. It also saw K-State pick up its first win in 31 games, dating back to the 29–12 win against Kansas on October 18, 1986.

Schedule

Personnel

Season summary

North Texas

Kansas State snapped 30-game winless streak (since 1986) and fans tore down the goalposts

References

Kansas State
Kansas State Wildcats football seasons
Kansas State Wildcats football